Asenath Hatch Nicholson (February 24, 1792 – May 15, 1855) was an American vegan, social observer and philanthropist. She wrote at first hand about the Great Hunger in Ireland in the 1840s. She wrote about the life of Ireland both before and during the crop failures that caused famin as she walked the country distributing copies of the Bible, food and clothing.

Life

Nicholson was born in Chelsea in Vermont in 1792. Her family belonged to the Protestant Congregation Church and she was named after the biblical Asenath, the daughter of Potipherah and wife of Joseph. She trained and became a successful teacher in her hometown before she married Norman Nicholson, a widower with three children, and went to live in New York. They family became interested in the diet recommended by Sylvester Graham. In the 1840s they ran a boarding house that offered this vegetarian diet. Nicholson also advocated exercise and occasional fasting. She published the first Graham recipes.

In May 1844, after her husband's death  she left New York for Ireland and when she arrived she walked around the country, visiting virtually every county. She noted that people lacked work and they relied almost entirely on their crop of potatoes. She left for Scotland in August having observed Ireland just before the outbreak of the Irish Famine. Upon her return to America, she wrote Ireland's Welcome to the Stranger, or, An Excursion through Ireland in 1844 & 1845, for the Purpose of Personally Investigating the Condition of the Poor, which was published in New York by Baker & Scribner in 1847.

She had a sharp eye for inequality and exploitation - exploring the grounds of Clifden Castle in Connemara she wrote of a grotto she discovered:

Now appeared a fairy castle, a house with variegated pillars and open door, made of shells of the most delicate shades, arranged in stars and circles of beautiful workmanship. These showed exquisite taste in the designer, and must have been done with great cost and care. I found that a laboring peasant was the architect of this wonderful fabric, but he was kept most religiously in his rank, laboring for eight pence a day.

In Roundstone a man described potatoes to her as "The greatest curse that ever was sent on Ireland; and I never sit down, see, use, or eat one, but I wish
every divil of 'em was out of the island. The blackguard of a Raleigh who brought 'em here, entailed a curse upon the laborer that has broke his heart. Because the landholder sees we can live and work hard on 'em, he grinds us down in our wages, and then despises us because we are ignorant and ragged." She comments: This is a pithy truth, one which I had never seen in so vivid a light as now.

She returned in 1846 during the second of the five annual crop failures of the potatoes on which the poor of Ireland depended, which, together with high unemployment, was creating a national disaster. Nicholson was concerned that she would just have to witness the suffering but she wrote to the New-York Tribune and The Emancipator in New York and assistance from their readers was organised. In the following July five barrels of corn arrived from New York. On the same ship were 50 barrels for the Central Relief Committee, but Nicholson preferred to go it alone.

She wrote an eyewitness account of the Great Hunger in Ireland in the 1840s, Annals of the Famine in Ireland, 1847, 1848 and 1849, which she had observed as she walked the country distributing bibles, food, and clothing.

Nicholson died in Jersey City in 1855.

Vegetarianism

In 1835, Nicholson authored the first American vegetarian cookbook, Nature's Own Book. Nicholson stated that "good bread, pure water, ripe fruit, and vegetables are my meat and drink exclusively." The book utilized some recipes with dairy, but Nicholson personally advocated against its use.

Nicholson also authored, Kitchen Philosophy for Vegetarians. The book was published by William Horsell in 1849. A review in the Vegetarian Advocate, noted that "butter and eggs are excluded" from the recipes. The Vegan Society have cited the book as the first vegan cookbook.

Selected publications

Nature's Own Book (1835)
Ireland's Welcome to the Stranger: Or An Excursion Through Ireland, in 1844 & 1845, for the Purpose of Personally Investigating the Condition of the Poor (1847)
Kitchen Philosophy for Vegetarians (1849)
Annals of the Famine in Ireland in 1847, in 1848 and 1849 (1851)
Loose Papers: Or, Facts Gathered During Eight Years' Residence in Ireland, Scotland, England, France, and Germany (1853)

References 

1792 births
1855 deaths
19th-century American non-fiction writers
19th-century American women writers
19th-century American philanthropists
American abolitionists
American cookbook writers
American vegetarianism activists
American women philanthropists
Fasting advocates
Orthopaths
People from Chelsea, Vermont
Philanthropists from Vermont
Vegan cookbook writers
Women cookbook writers
Writers from Vermont
19th-century women philanthropists